The Fairfield Community Connection (FCC) was a bulletin board system (BBS) located in Fairfield, Connecticut, United States.  It was created in 1994 by SysOp R. Scott Perry. It was the largest BBS in southwestern Connecticut, consisting of over 8 nodes.

History 
FCC was opened to the public on February 1, 1994, with four nodes, increased eight 8 nodes in May 1994, and finally to 14 nodes in February, 1996. It provided Internet e-mail starting in February 1994 and full Internet access in March 1995. It was merged with the Powerhouse BBS in June, 1996. The phone number was 335-4073.

FCC was set up using Galacticomm's Major BBS/Worldgroup software. Lacking in game and download sections, FCC's main appeal was its chat room(s). Many people also used the message boards to communicate. This local connection provided opportunities for BBS meets as well as long-term friendship with others.

FCC helped to usher in a larger era of BBS in southwestern Connecticut, including No Class BBS, Powerhouse, Kirby, Alcatraz and The Dog Pound.

FCC regulars included Snoop, Gambit, Montyp, Star, Raven and Master Wu.

External links 
 A list of local CT BBSes from 1995 put together by SHS

Bulletin board systems